The Rendőrség (English: Police) is the national civil law enforcement agency of Hungary and is governed by the Interior Ministry.

History

Until 2006, the police operated under the authority of the Ministry of Interior. From 2006 to 2010, the Ministry of Justice and Law Enforcement was the governing body of the police, which absorbed the Border Guard on December 31, 2007.In 2010, the government reinstated the Interior Ministry.

The police have national headquarters in the capital but otherwise operate through its county commands. Other national bodies include the National Bureau of Investigation (modeled after the FBI), Counter-terrorism Centre (TEK, an elite commando of heavily armed officers), and KR (Riot police and Rapid Response Unit, Propaganda bureau a civil law enforcement agency).

On July 1, 2010, the government decided to set up the Counter-terrorism Center, which was responsible for preventing terrorist attacks, protecting government officials, and serving as an intelligence service. In 2011, the government established the Office for the Protection of the Constitution (AH), the Counter-terrorism Center, the National Security Service (NBSZ), and the National Defense Service (NVSZ). The Interior Ministry governs all of these new agencies.

On July 1, 2012, the government disbanded the Republican Regiment, which was responsible for protecting government officials.

Agencies under the police 
The Customs and Finance Guard is under the control of the Ministry of National Economy, which is the successor for both the Tax and Financial Control Office and the National Tax and Customs Office (NAV.) The Directorate-General for Crime is a separate tax police within the NAV that investigates financial crimes. Other law enforcement agencies include the Prisons Enforcement Agency, the Disaster Protection Agency, and the Parliamentary Guard. The Ministry of Interior controls both the Counter-terrorism Center and the controversial National Defense Service. The Office for the Protection of the Constitution usually does secret investigations on organized crime groups that threaten national security. However, it is also starting to arrest people.

On January 1, 2008, the parliament passed an amendment that merged the Border Guard into the National Police and transferred Border Guard's property, vehicles, and other assets to the National Police. The National Police later established the Border Police Department, which secures the border by detecting and preventing illegal immigration.

Workforce statistics of selected law enforcement agencies

Ranks

Officers

Others

Equipment

TT-30 pistol
Makarov pistol
CZ P-09 pistol
CZ P-07 pistol
CZ 75 SP-01 Tactical pistol
FEG P9R pistol
Heckler & Koch USP pistol
Jericho 941F pistol
Heckler & Koch MP5 Submachine Gun
UZI Submachine Gun
AMD-65 Assault Rifle
PKM Light Machine Gun
Dragunov Sniper Rifle
Gepárd Anti-materiel Rifle
Unique Alpine TPG-1 Precision Sniper Rifle
CS gas
First Defense MK-9 and MK-4 Pepper Sprays
40mm grenade launcher with Non-lethal Charges

Current vehicles

Dacia Duster
Audi A3
Audi A6 Avant
Audi A4
Audi TT
BMW R1200RT
Mercedes-Benz B-Class
Mercedes-Benz E-Class
Mercedes-Benz Sprinter
Mercedes-Benz Vito
Nissan Pathfinder
Nissan Patrol
Opel Astra
Opel Vivaro
Škoda Octavia
Skoda Octavia RS
Škoda Superb
Škoda Yeti
Suzuki Vitara
Volkswagen Amarok
Volkswagen Transporter
Volkswagen Caddy
Yamaha FJR1300
Mil Mi-2
MD Helicopters MD 500
MD Helicopters MD 902

Obsolete vehicles
Lada 2101
Lada 2105
Lada 2107

See also
Law Enforcement and Public Safety Service
Crime in Hungary

References

Law enforcement in Hungary
National Central Bureaus of Interpol